The Great Southern and Western Railway (GS&WR) Classes 301. 305, 309 and 321 consisted of 26 4-4-0 tender locomotives designed by Robert Coey for passenger work and built between 1900 and 1907.

Design and build
One priority at the start of the 1900s was to cater for the forecast increasing passenger train weights, the Cork limited mail for example increase from a load of eight six wheeled carriages in the 1860s weight less than 100 tons to over 250 tones by 1905.  To address this problem Coey introduced a series of  locomotives that were noticeably larger than the preceding class 52 and 60.

The earlier classes were somewhat restricted in steaming. Records for the original 301 class seem to have some omissions and discrepancies but the Class 305, which had slightly larger heating surfaces than Class 301, were rebuilt almost immediately by 1906 with tapered saturated boilers.  No. 308, rebuilt after just two years in 1904 to trial this border, was found to be seriously overweight and required remedial work on the frames to correct; this may have weakened them and it is speculated may have been the cause of the locomotives' early demise in 1933.

The evolved Class 321 with its tapered boiler and larger cylinder achieving a 20% increase in tractive effort over Class 301, albeit at the expense of a high axle load which restricted it to the Cork and Limerick main lines.

Service

Most of Coeys' 4-4-0 locomotives gave service through to the late 1950s of even 1960 when they were displaced by the arrival of diesels.  There are suggestions that most of the few earlier withdrawals may have been due to structural issues with the need to reduce weight.

On introduction the classes were the most powerful passenger locomotives on the GS&WR and all were noted for their ability to run at speed given a light enough load.  Class 321 were allocated to the Cork and Limerick expresses.  The arrival of the Coey/Maunsell prototype Sir William Goulding in 1913 and Watson's Call 400 4-6-0 in 1916 that Class 321 were displaced as first choice from the Cork Mail.  Only after 1923 were further 4-6-0 locomotives to appear displacing the Class 321 from some of their duties though they were still often called in to deputise.

Successors

Coey used the Class 321 as the basis for the smaller wheeled GS&WR Class 333 which had better route availability due to a lower axle loading and was better suited for mixed traffic work.   Coey's last 4-4-0 design before early retirement at 60 to ill health was completed by Maunsell as the prototype Class 341 Sir William Goulding.

References

Footnotes

Sources
 
 
 

4-4-0 locomotives
5 ft 3 in gauge locomotives
Railway locomotives introduced in 1900
Scrapped locomotives
Steam locomotives of Ireland